The 1969 Big Ten Conference football season was the 74th season of college football played by the member schools of the Big Ten Conference and was a part of the 1969 NCAA University Division football season.

The 1969 Michigan Wolverines football team, in the program's first year under head coach Bo Schembechler, was ranked No. 9 in the final AP Poll. The 1969 Michigan vs. Ohio State football game was considered one of the biggest upsets in college football history, as Ohio State came into the game with an 8–0 record, a 22-game winning streak and the No. 1 ranking in the polls. Michigan defeated Ohio State, 24–12, to win the Big Ten's berth in the 1970 Rose Bowl, where they lost to USC. Michigan tight end Jim Mandich and defensive back Tom Curtis were consensus first-team All-Americans. Mandich was selected as the team's most valuable player.

The 1969 Ohio State Buckeyes football team, under head coach Woody Hayes, was ranked No. 1 in the AP Poll every week until losing to Michigan in the final game of the regular season. After the loss to Michigan, the Buckeyes dropped to No. 4 in the final AP Poll. Defensive back Jack Tatum, running back Jim Otis, and middle guard Jim Stillwagon were consensus first-team All-Americans. Otis was selected as the team's most valuable player.

The 1969 Purdue Boilermakers football team, in its final season under head coach Jack Mollenkopf, compiled an 8–2 record and was ranked No. 18 in the final polls. Quarterback Mike Phipps totaled 2,527 passing yards, won the Chicago Tribune Silver Football trophy as the conference's most valuable player, was selected as the consensus first-team All-American quarterback, received the Sammy Baugh Trophy as the nation's top collegiate passer, and finished second in the voting for the 1969 Heisman Trophy.

Season overview

Results and team statistics

Key
AP final = Team's rank in the final AP Poll of the 1969 season
AP high = Team's highest rank in the AP Poll throughout the 1969 season
PPG = Average of points scored per game; conference leader's average displayed in bold
PAG = Average of points allowed per game; conference leader's average displayed in bold
MVP = Most valuable player as voted by players on each team as part of the voting process to determine the winner of the Chicago Tribune Silver Football trophy; trophy winner in bold

Preseason

On December 24, 1968, the University of Michigan announced that head football coach Bump Elliott would assume a new job as associate athletic director and that a new football coach was being sought. Two days later, the university announced that Bo Schembechler had been hired as Elliott's replacement.

Regular season

September 20

September 27

October 4

October 11

October 18

October 25

November 1

November 7

November 15

November 22

Bowl games

On January 1, 1970, Michigan lost to USC, 10–3, at the Rose Bowl in Pasadena, California. The score was tied, 3–3, at halftime. With three minutes to play in the third quarter, USC quarterback Jimmy Jones threw a 33-yard touchdown pass to Bob Chandler to give the Trojans the 10–3 victory.  Michigan head coach Bo Schembechler suffered a heart attack the night before the game and was in the hospital during the game. Defensive coordinator Jim Young assumed the coaching responsibilities for the game.

Statistical leaders

The Big Ten's individual statistical leaders include the following:

Passing yards
1. Mike Phipps, Purdue (2,527)
2. Larry Lawrence, Iowa (1,680)
3. Harry Gonso, Indiana (1,336)
4. Maurie Daigneau, Northwestern (1,276)
5. Phil Hagen, Minnesota (1,266)

Rushing yards
1. John Isenbarger, Indiana (1,217)
2. Jim Otis, Ohio State (1,027)
3. Don Highsmith, Michigan State (937)
4. Alan Thompson, Wisconsin (907)
5. Billy Taylor, Michigan (864)

Receiving yards
1. Kerry Reardon, Iowa (738)
2. Stan Brown, Purdue (725)
3. Ashley Bell, Purdue (669)
4. Jim Mandich, Michigan (662)
5. Jade Butcher, Indiana (552)

Total yards
1. Mike Phipps, Purdue (2,745)
2. Larry Lawrence, Iowa (2,086)
3. Don Moorhead, Michigan (1,886)
4. Rex Kern, Ohio State (1,585)
5. Harry Gonso, Indiana (1,573)

Point scored
1. Jim Otis, Ohio State (96)
1. Stan Brown, Purdue (96)
3. Garvie Craw, Michigan (78)
4. Ashley Bell, Purdue (66)
5. Jade Butcher, Indiana (60)

Awards and honors

All-Big Ten honors

The following players were picked by the Associated Press (AP) and/or the United Press International (UPI) as first-team players on the 1969 All-Big Ten Conference football team.

Offense

Defense

All-American honors

At the end of the 1969 season, Big Ten players secured six of the consensus first-team picks for the 1969 College Football All-America Team. The Big Ten's consensus All-American was:

Other Big Ten players who were named first-team All-Americans by at least one selector were:

Other awards
Purdue quarterback Mike Phipps received the Sammy Baugh Trophy as the nation's top collegiate passer. He also finished second in the voting for the Heisman Trophy.

References